NA-5 Upper Dir is a constituency for the National Assembly of Pakistan. It comprises the whole district of Upper Dir. The area was formerly part of NA-33 (Upper Dir-cum-Lower Dir) constituency from 1977 to 2018. That constituency also included parts of the district of Lower Dir. The constituency for Upper Dir was named NA-5 (Upper Dir).

Members of Parliament

1977–2002: NA-33 (Upper Dir-cum-Lower Dir)

2002–2018: NA-33 (Upper Dir-cum-Lower Dir)

Since 2018: NA-5 (Upper Dir)

Election 2002

General Elections were held on 10 October 2002. Molana Asad Ullah won this seat with 39,362 votes

Election 2008

A total of 2,020 votes were rejected.

Election 2013

A total of 4,360 votes were rejected.

Election 2018 

General elections were held on 25 July 2018.

†JI and JUI-F contested as part of MMA

By-election 2023 
A by-election will be held on 19 March 2023 due to the resignation of Sahibzada Sibghatullah, the previous MNA from this seat.

See also
NA-4 Swat-III
NA-6 Lower Dir-I

References

External links 
Election result's official website

5
5